The men's C-1 slalom canoeing competition at the 2014 Asian Games in Hanam was held from 1 to 2 October at the Misari Canoe/Kayak Center. The slalom event was on flat water and not an artificial canoe slalom course. The C-1 (canoe single) event is raced by one-man canoes. Each NOC could enter two athletes but only one of them could advance to the semifinal.

Schedule
All times are Korea Standard Time (UTC+09:00)

Results 
Legend
 DSQ — Disqualified

Heats

Last 16

Quarterfinals

Race 1

Race 2

Race 3

Race 4

Summary

Semifinals

Race 1

Race 2

Finals

Bronze medal

Gold medal

References

External links 
 Official website

Canoeing at the 2014 Asian Games